Christopher Herperger (born February 24, 1974) is a Canadian former professional ice hockey player who played in the National Hockey League for the Chicago Blackhawks, Ottawa Senators, and Atlanta Thrashers between 1999 and 2003. Following that he spent several years playing in the Deutsche Eishockey Liga, the top league in Germany, retiring in 2013.

Playing career
Herperger was drafted 223rd overall by the Philadelphia Flyers in the 1992 NHL Entry Draft. He played in the National Hockey League for the Chicago Blackhawks, Ottawa Senators and the Atlanta Thrashers. He played 169 regular season games in total, scoring 18 goals, making 25 assists, and collecting 75 penalty minutes.

Herperger then moved to Germany's Deutsche Eishockey Liga in 2003 and played for the Krefeld Pinguine for three seasons, and then to Switzerland to play for the Kloten Flyers of Nationalliga A. He returned to Germany after a single season, and signed with the Hannover Scorpions. Herperger played the final six years of his career with Hannover, before retiring at the end of the 2012–13 season, also the Scorpions last in the DEL.

Career statistics

Regular season and playoffs

Awards
 WHL West Second All-Star Team – 1995

References

External links
 

1974 births
Living people
Atlanta Thrashers players
Baltimore Bandits players
Canadian expatriate ice hockey players in Germany
Canadian ice hockey centres
Chicago Blackhawks players
Chicago Wolves players
Cleveland Lumberjacks players
Ice hockey people from Saskatchewan
Indianapolis Ice players
Hannover Scorpions players
Hershey Bears players
EHC Kloten players
Krefeld Pinguine players
Manitoba Moose players
Norfolk Admirals players
Ottawa Senators players
Philadelphia Flyers draft picks
Seattle Thunderbirds players
Swift Current Broncos players